Ren Zhenhe (born February 1964) is a Chinese politician of Tujia ethnicity, serving since December 2020 as the Governor of the Gansu Province.

Biography 
Ren Zhenhe was born in Hefeng County, Hubei. In 1984, he joined the Chinese Communist Party. He graduated from Huazhong Institute of Technology (present-day Huazhong University of Science and Technology) with a bachelor's degree in 1988, majoring in technical economics. He had been served as the Vice Magistrate of Hefeng County (1993–1996), Deputy Party Secretary of Hefeng County (1996), Deputy Party Secretary of Lichuan (1996–1997), Mayor of Lichuan (1997–1998, acting: 1996–1997), Party Secretary of Lichuan (1998–2002), Deputy Governor of Enshi Tujia and Miao Autonomous Prefecture (2001–2003), Deputy Party Secretary of Enshi (2003–2006), Deputy Party Secretary of Huanggang (2006–2008), Deputy Party Secretary and Mayor of Xianning (2008–2012), Party Secretary of Xianning (2012–2015), Deputy Governor of Hubei Province (2015–2016), Party Secretary of Xiangyang (2016–2017), Head of the Organization Department of Zhejiang Province (2017–2018), head of the Supervision Commission of Zhejiang (2019, acting: 2018–2019), head of the Zhejiang Commission for Discipline Inspection (2018–2019), and Deputy Party Secretary of Jiangsu Province (2019– November 2020). 

In November 2020, Ren was appointed as the Deputy Party Secretary of Gansu Province. In December, Ren was named the acting Governor of Gansu. He was elected as the Governor in January 2021.

Ren is a delegate to the 13th National People's Congress.

Reference 

1964 births
Living people
Tujia people
People from Enshi
Huazhong University of Science and Technology alumni
Chinese Communist Party politicians from Hubei
Governors of Gansu
Delegates to the 13th National People's Congress